Bu Yong-chan (born ) is a South Korean male volleyball player. He currently plays the libero position for the Ansan OK Savings Bank Rush & Cash.

Career

Clubs
In the 2011 V-League Draft, Bu was selected third overall by the  LIG Greaters. After the 2015–16 season, Bu was traded to the Samsung Fire Bluefangs in exchange for veteran middle blocker Lee Sun-kyu.

National team
In June 2012 Bu was first selected for the South Korean senior national team to compete at the 2012 FIVB World League.

Bu took part as the starting libero for the South Korean national team at the 2013 Asian Championship, where the team won the silver medal.

He was also a member of the national team at the 2014 FIVB World Championship in Poland.

Individual awards

Club
 2017 V-League - Best Libero

References

External links
Bu Yong-chan at Gumi KB Insurance Stars Volleyball Club 

1989 births
Living people
South Korean men's volleyball players
Place of birth missing (living people)
Asian Games medalists in volleyball
Volleyball players at the 2014 Asian Games
Volleyball players at the 2018 Asian Games
Hanyang University alumni
Medalists at the 2014 Asian Games
Medalists at the 2018 Asian Games
Asian Games silver medalists for South Korea
Asian Games bronze medalists for South Korea
Sportspeople from Jeju Province
21st-century South Korean people